"Glock in My Lap" is a song by Atlanta-based rapper 21 Savage and American record producer Metro Boomin, from their collaborative studio album Savage Mode 2 (2020). The song was produced by Metro Boomin, Southside and Honorable C.N.O.T.E.

Composition and critical reception
The song features "urgent trap drums", an "unsettling two-note piano riff" and orchestral elements. Alphonse Pierre of Pitchfork described the beat as "arguable the most cinematic" one that Metro has ever produced. In a review of Savage Mode 2 on HipHopDX, Mark Elibert wrote that 21 Savage's lyrics throughout the album are "more polished and lively" than before, citing the following lines from "Glock in My Lap": "Leave an opp cold, like December / .45 on me, it's a Kimber / AK knockin' down trees, like timber / Get your baby mama 'fore we bend her / Hit the windshield, not the fender / Givin' out smoke my agenda / Throw the white flag, they surrender".

Music video
The official music video was released on February 24, 2021. Directed by Andrew Donoho, the video begins with 21 Savage and Metro Boomin driving one night and seeing a chainsaw wielder resembling Leatherface from The Texas Chainsaw Massacre, which leads to a car crash. The two exit their car in the midst of thick smoke and beaming red lights, and venture into a nearby "shadowy abandoned town" to look for help and hunt down the chainsaw wielder. They are joined by Honorable C.N.O.T.E. Soon, the three are confronted by the Leatherface-like character, who is eventually shot down by Metro and C.N.O.T.E.

Charts

Certifications

References

2020 songs
21 Savage songs
Metro Boomin songs
Songs written by 21 Savage
Songs written by Metro Boomin
Songs written by Southside (record producer)
Song recordings produced by Metro Boomin
Song recordings produced by Southside (record producer)